Martín Dalmau (born c. 1974) is a provincial deputy in Mendoza Province in Argentina, elected in October 2013.

He is a member of the Workers' Party (Argentina) and was elected as a candidate of the Workers' Left Front.

He worked as a history teacher at a high school in Las Heras, Mendoza.

External links 
Article on Dalmau at Taringa! 

1970s births
Living people
Argentine schoolteachers
Workers' Party (Argentina) politicians
People from Mendoza Province
21st-century Argentine educators